Crepidiastrum is an Asian genus of flowering plants in the family Asteraceae.

 Species

References

 
Asteraceae genera